RU11 is a consortium consisting of eleven top Research Universities in Japan. Established in November 2009, this consortium is actively committed in the international academic community. RU11 is made up of 9 national and 2 private universities.

Members

National Universities
 Hokkaido University
 Tohoku University
 University of Tsukuba
 University of Tokyo
 Tokyo Institute of Technology
 Nagoya University
 Osaka University
 Kyoto University
 Kyushu University

Private Universities
 Keio University
 Waseda University

Missions
Briefly, their two missions are as follows(Details are in the link below);
 Discuss measures for enhancement in order to strengthen research universities.
 Improve cooperation between the research universities and pooling of information.

External links
http://www.ru11.jp/eng/index.html

References

College and university associations and consortia in Asia
Universities and colleges in Japan